Laura Spencer Portor Pope (4 February 1872 – 1957) was an American journalist and author of short stories and several books. She is known as the co-author with Dorothy Giles of two science fiction novels, The valley of creeping men (1930) and Chattering gods (1931), both of which appeared under the pseudonym "Rayburn Crawley."

Biographical facts
Laura Spencer Portor married Francis Pope, but she continued to use the name "Laura Spencer Portor" for all her professional publications except the two science novels which she co-authored. She published articles and short stories in Woman's Home Companion, Harper's Magazine, The Outlook, The Dial and several other magazines.

Selected publications
; lettering and decorations by Joan D. Manning
with Katharine Pyle: ; illustrated from drawings by William A. McCullough
; 

with Alida Conover as illustrator: ;

References

External links
 

1872 births
1957 deaths
19th-century American women writers
19th-century American writers
20th-century American women writers
20th-century American non-fiction writers
American women journalists
People from Covington, Kentucky
Kentucky women writers